The wide-striped mulch slider (Lerista elongata)  is a species of skink found in South Australia.

References

Lerista
Reptiles described in 1990
Taxa named by Glen Milton Storr